Banff and Buchan College was until 1 November 2013 the name of the further education institution in Aberdeenshire, Scotland.

In November 2013, Banff & Buchan College merged with Aberdeen College to form North East Scotland College. The new regional college will continue to serve an extensive geographical area with its main centres of delivery in Aberdeen and Fraserburgh.

References

External links
Banff and Buchan College

Educational institutions established in 1982
Further education colleges in Scotland
Education in Aberdeenshire
1982 establishments in Scotland
Buildings and structures in Fraserburgh